Sri Jayadev College of pharmaceutical sciences is a college in Bhubaneswar, Odisha, India providing Pharmacy education since 1983.

About Us
Sri Jayadev College of pharmaceutical sciences being among the oldest institution in Odisha providing diploma, Degree & P.G courses in Pharmacy. The all above courses are approved by All India Council for Technical Education and affiliated to Biju Patnaik University of Technology, Pharmacy Council Of India. Diploma wing of sri jayadev college of pharmaceutical sciences is closed. Now college only provides B.pharm and M.pharm courses.

Academics
For D.Pharm, B.Pharm & M.Pharm.

References

External links
Sri Jayadev College of pharmaceutical sciences

Pharmacy schools in India
Universities and colleges in Bhubaneswar
Science and technology in Bhubaneswar
Colleges affiliated with Biju Patnaik University of Technology
Educational institutions established in 1983
1983 establishments in Orissa